The International Journal of Transpersonal Studies is a biannual peer-reviewed academic journal covering theory, research, practice, and discourse in the area of transpersonal studies. It is the official journal of the International Transpersonal Association, is published by Floraglades Foundation, and is sponsored by the California Institute of Integral Studies. The editor-in-chief is Glenn Hartelius (California Institute of Integral Studies).

Abstracting and indexing
The journal is abstracted and indexed in PsycINFO, Scopus, ATLA Religion Database, EBSCO databases, and the MLA International Bibliography.

See also
Journal of Transpersonal Psychology

References

External links

Transpersonal studies
Publications established in 1982
English-language journals
Biannual journals